Shoshone Falls is a waterfall in the western United States, on the Snake River in south-central Idaho, approximately  northeast of the city of Twin Falls.

Formed by the cataclysmic outburst flooding of Lake Bonneville during the Pleistocene ice age about 14,000 years ago, Shoshone Falls marks the historical upper limit of fish migration (including salmon) in the Snake River, and was an important fishing and trading place for Native Americans. The falls were documented by Europeans as early as the 1840s; despite the isolated location, it became a tourist attraction starting in the 1860s.

At the beginning of the 20th century, part of the Snake River was diverted for irrigation of the Magic Valley. Now, the flows over the falls can be viewed seasonally based on snowfall, irrigation needs and hydroelectric demands. Irrigation and hydroelectric power stations built on the falls were major contributors to the early economic development of southern Idaho.

The City of Twin Falls owns and operates a park overlooking the waterfall. Shoshone Falls is best viewed in the spring, as diversion of the Snake River can significantly diminish water levels in the late summer and fall.

Characteristics

The appearance of the falls varies significantly with the river's flow rate. During high water, the falls appear as a single block stretching the full width of the river. In low water, the falls split into four or more separate drops; the widest, northern section is also called Bridal Veil Falls.

Flows
Located in an arid region, Shoshone Falls naturally received most of its water from snowmelt in the Rocky Mountains of Idaho and Wyoming near Yellowstone and Grand Teton National Parks, and to a lesser extent springs in the Snake River Canyon above Twin Falls.

Idaho Power's Shoshone Falls Dam is located directly upstream from the falls and diverts water to the Shoshone hydroelectric plant, further reducing the water volume. Further complicating the issue is that most irrigation water is needed in the summer, which coincides with the peak tourist season. The best time to view the falls is between April and June, when snowmelt is peaking, and when water is released from upriver reservoirs to assist steelhead migration.

Geology
Most of the rocks underlying the Snake River Plain originated from massive lava flows related to eruptions of the Yellowstone hotspot over many millions of years. Shoshone Falls flows over a 6-million-year-old rhyolite or trachyte lava flow that intersects the weaker basalt layers comprising the surrounding Snake River Plain, creating a natural knickpoint that resists water erosion.

The falls themselves were created quite suddenly during the cataclysmic Bonneville Flood at the end of the Pleistocene ice age, about 14,500–17,000 years ago, when pluvial Lake Bonneville, an immense freshwater lake that covered much of the Great Basin, overflowed through Red Rock Pass into the Snake River. About  of water were released, 1,500 times the average annual flow of the Snake River at Twin Falls. The massive flow of water carved the Snake River Canyon in a matter of several weeks, sculpting falls such as Shoshone Falls where the local geology intersected harder underlying rock layers.

The immense Snake River Aquifer is formed in the region's porous volcanic rock and recharged each year by melting snow in the surrounding mountains. Because the Shoshone Falls canyon lies lower in elevation than the surrounding terrain, groundwater is forced to the surface via large springs in the canyon walls. Spring flow varies widely depending on the season, although it has increased since the 1950s due to irrigation water on the surrounding plain percolating into the aquifer.

Ecology
Due to its great height, Shoshone Falls is a total barrier to the upstream movement of fish. Anadromous fish (which live in the ocean as adults, but return to fresh water to lay eggs) such as salmon and steelhead/rainbow trout, and other migratory fish such as sturgeon, cannot pass the falls. Prior to the construction of many dams on the Snake River below Shoshone Falls, spawning fish would congregate in great numbers at the base of the falls, where they were a major food source for local Native Americans. Yellowstone cutthroat trout lived above the falls in the same ecological niche as rainbow trout below it, although their range has decreased since the 19th century due to river diversions and competition from introduced species such as lake trout.

Due to this marked difference, the World Wide Fund for Nature uses Shoshone Falls as the boundary between the Upper Snake and the Columbia Unglaciated freshwater ecoregions. The Snake River above Shoshone Falls shares only 35 percent of its fish species with those of the lower Snake River below the falls. Fourteen fish species found in the upper Snake are also found in the Bonneville freshwater ecoregion (which covers the Great Basin portion of Utah), but not the lower Snake or Columbia rivers. The upper Snake River is also high in freshwater mollusk endemism (such as snails and clams).

History

Native peoples and explorers

The Shoshone Falls are named for the Lemhi Shoshone or Agaidika ("Salmon eaters") people, who depended on the Snake River's immense salmon runs as their primary food source, though they also supplemented their diet with various roots, nuts and large game such as buffalo. Because the falls are the upstream limit of salmon migration in the Snake River, they served as a central food source and trading center for the native peoples, who fished with willow spears tipped with elk horn. The Bannock people also traveled to Shoshone Falls each summer to gather salmon.

Although the Lewis and Clark Expedition encountered the Shoshone Indians in 1805–06, they did not pass through the Shoshone Falls area. The 1811 Wilson Price Hunt Expedition, whose goal was to scout routes for the growing fur trade, traveled down the Snake River as far as Caldron Linn, a wild rapids located near present-day Murtaugh. There, where the river drops into the precipitous Snake River Canyon, a canoe capsized and one of Hunt's Canadian boatmen was drowned. Although the party explored the canyon for several miles downstream, Hunt's journal does not mention any waterfalls as large as Shoshone Falls. Hunt then split the group to make foraging easier and they basically walked out of Idaho. The routes they pioneered became part of the Oregon Trail, which brought many emigrants from the eastern United States to the Shoshone Falls area.

Over the next thirty years, American and British-Canadian fur trappers hunted throughout south-central Idaho and are believed to have observed Shoshone Falls. However, none of those who kept journals mentioned the feature.

John C. Frémont passed through the Shoshone Falls area during his 1843 expedition, which aimed to map the country through which passed the western half of the Oregon Trail. None of his party observed the falls, however, because they left the river canyon (probably near Murtaugh) and cut southwest across a sandy plain to reach Rock Creek. They returned to the canyon rim where Rock Creek enters the Snake. There, he observed the Thousands Springs, which he described as “a subterranean river [that] bursts out directly from the face of the escarpment.”

They descended into the canyon with some difficulty, made some river measurements, and continued downstream. They camped about a mile below what Frémont called "Fishing Falls": "a series of cataracts with very inclined planes, which are probably so named because they form a barrier to the ascent of the salmon; and the great fisheries from which the inhabitants of this barren region almost entirely derive a subsistence commence at this place." He observed that the salmon were "so abundant that they [the Shoshone] merely throw in their spears at random, certain of bringing out fish." This stretch of the river is now known as Salmon Falls. Early encounters between Europeans and Native Americans were generally friendly, but eventually brutal conflicts broke out over land ownership. After the Snake War, some twenty years later, the Shoshone were confined on reservations elsewhere.

Pioneer traffic along the Oregon Trail through Idaho increased steadily from 1843 on, with a spurt after Frémont's journal was published and distributed. In 1847, some 4,000 emigrants passed through on their way to Oregon. One of the parties that year included Roman Catholic Bishop Augustin-Magloire Blanchet, who had been appointed to lead the new Diocese of Walla Walla. Traveling along the north side of the river, the group made a detour, perhaps guided by a former trapper who was familiar with the area. Blanchett then made the first known written record of seeing Shoshone Falls. Being from Quebec, Canada, he called the feature “Canadian Falls.”

That designation did not last very long, however. In August 1849, a column of U.S. Army “Mounted Rifles” marched by, headed for Oregon. They took a route somewhat closer to the canyon and heard the thunder of the falls. A local Indian had told their guide about the feature, so the guide led Lieutenant Andrew Lindsay and George Gibbs, a civilian writer and artist, to see them. Gibbs drew the first known image of the falls, and the pair selected “Shoshone Falls” as a more appropriate name.

The 1868 Geological Exploration of the Fortieth Parallel, led by later U.S. Geological Survey director Clarence King, was the first to closely study the geology, soils and minerals of the Shoshone Falls area. King described the country as "strange and savage", and said of the falls themselves: "You ride upon a waste. Suddenly, you stand upon a brink. Black walls flank the abyss. A great river fights its way through the labyrinth of blackened ruins and plunges in foaming whiteness." He was also the first to speculate that the falls and canyon, rather than being formed by erosion over millennia, might have been created by "moments of great catastrophe" considering the region's chaotic volcanic history. Timothy H. O'Sullivan was also a member of the 1868 expedition, and became the first national photographer to picture the falls. O'Sullivan also returned to the area in 1874, again to photograph Shoshone Falls.

Tourism and development
Shoshone Falls became a tourist attraction in the mid-19th century, despite its inhospitable and isolated surroundings. Travelers on the Oregon Trail often stopped to visit the falls, which required only a "slight detour" to the north. Promoters of tourism to the falls cited the "lonely grandeur" of the surrounding country and the fact that the falls were not "overshadowed by a city", perhaps in reference to Niagara Falls which at this time had become infamous for the rampant commercial development adjacent to it. The first known reference to Shoshone Falls as "The Niagara of the West" was in an article from an unknown Salt Lake City paper, reprinted in the Philadelphia Bulletin in 1866, in which the falls were described as "a world wonder which for savage scenery and power sublime stands unrivaled in America". The falls were painted by Thomas Moran, famous for his depictions of rugged Western landscapes such as Yellowstone, in 1900 for the 1901 Pan-American Exposition.

In 1869, gold was discovered in the canyon in the vicinity of Shoshone Falls; by 1872, about 3,000 miners had come to the area in search of the precious metal. The towns of Shoshone City, Springtown, and Drytown were created as a result of the gold rush. However, the boom quickly ended as the local geology and manner of sediment deposits made it difficult to remove gold. The first miners were mainly of European descent, and were later replaced by Chinese miners who continued to work the claims into the early 1880s, in search of the fine gold particles known as "gold flour".

In 1876, Charles Walgamott, a local homesteader, foresaw the potential of the falls as a tourist destination, fenced large tracts of land surrounding the falls and began construction on a lodge, hoping to obtain title to said land through squatter's rights. In 1883, the Oregon Short Line Railroad was extended to Shoshone, making travel to the falls much easier, and Walgamott sold the land to "a syndicate of capitalists including Montana Senator William A. Clark, who intended to replace the hotel with a far grander establishment and to place a recreational steamship on the river." In April of the following year, Walgamott was granted a license to operate a cable ferry across the Snake River upstream of the falls. Not surprisingly, this ferry was one of the most dangerous river crossings in Idaho. In 1904 and 1905, boats broke loose from the cable and were swept over the falls, killing four people. Many other near misses and incidents also took place. The hazards of the crossing led to a demand for a road or rail bridge that would span the canyon just below the falls. Although Twin Falls County commissioners deemed the idea "feasible", it was ultimately dropped due to its high cost.

Irrigation and the drying of Shoshone Falls
Ira Burton Perrine arrived in the Shoshone Falls area in 1884 and initially homesteaded at the bottom of the Snake River Canyon, where he raised cattle and planted orchards. He later became involved in the tourist business, starting a ferry and a stagecoach service, and building the Blue Lakes Hotel. However, Perrine is best known for his role in the economic development of southern Idaho based on massive irrigation projects, and consequentially, the periodic drying of Shoshone Falls. Perrine's ultimate goal was to irrigate  of land.

Senator Clark and others who owned land at Shoshone Falls filed a lawsuit against the Twin Falls Land and Water Company, but were defeated in the Idaho Supreme Court in 1904. The Milner Dam and the major canals required to deliver water were completed by 1905. "On March 1, 1905, Frank Buhl gave a ceremonial pull on the wheel on a winch and the gates of Milner Dam were closed, and the gates to a thousand miles of canal and laterals were opened, and the Snake River was diverted, and that night Shoshone Falls went dry as the water rushed across the desert far above, and Perrine's vision was realized, and 262,000 acres of desert were shortly transformed."

The reclamation of vast tracts of desert into productive farmland practically overnight led to the regional moniker of "Magic Valley". Powered entirely by gravity, it was "a rare successful example" of private irrigation development under the Carey Act. The city of Twin Falls was incorporated in 1905, on lands originally platted for town development as part of the irrigation project. In 1913, Perrine built an electric streetcar system to transport tourists from the city to Shoshone Falls. In part due to the intervention of World War I, which resulted in short supply of iron, the rail line was never completed as planned. The post-war rise in automobile ownership also made the line obsolete, and it was de-commissioned in 1916.

The Shoshone Falls Power Plant was completed in 1907 by the Greater Shoshone and Twin Falls Water Power Company. A low head diversion dam (the Shoshone Falls Dam) was built directly upstream of the falls and diverted water into a penstock, further reducing the amount of water flowing over the falls. The plant initially had a capacity of 500 kilowatts (KW), and was purchased by Idaho Power in 1916. Over the years, it was expanded and ultimately replaced with newer units capable of generating 12,500 KW. In 2015, Idaho Power released a plan to increase the capacity to 64,000 KW, which increased the water diversions and consequently effect even greater reductions of the water available to flow over the falls.

Evel Knievel's jump

Knievel and his team purchased land on both sides of the Snake River and built a large earthen ramp and launch structure on the south rim.

A crowd of 30,000 gathered on Sunday afternoon to watch Knievel's jump, which failed because his parachute deployed prematurely, causing him to float down towards the river. Knievel, from Butte, Montana, likely would have drowned were it not for canyon winds that blew him to the river's south bank; he ultimately survived with a broken nose. In September 2016, professional stuntman Eddie Braun successfully jumped the Snake River Canyon in a replica of Knievel's rocket.

Public access and recreation

As early as 1900, locals called for the creation of a national park at Shoshone Falls, although this proposal was never approved by Congress. In 1919, the Shoshone Falls Memorial Park Association proposed a memorial park at the falls for World War I veterans. The association hired California landscape architect Florence Yoch to design a plan for the park. However, these plans never materialized, in part due to the difficulties of obtaining the needed land from its previous owners. Frederick and Martha Adams later bought the land from Senator Clark, and donated it to the City of Twin Falls in 1932. The state of Idaho donated another tract of land in 1933 to add to the park.

Today, Shoshone Falls Park encompasses the south bank of the Snake River at the falls. A $5 vehicle fee is posted from March 30 through September 30 . The park includes an overlook, interpretive displays and a trail system along the south rim of the Snake River Canyon. The trails provide access to nearby points of interest including Dierkes Lake and Evel Knievel's 1974 jump site. About 250,000 to 300,000 vehicles enter the park each year.

In 2015 Idaho Power completed the Shoshone Falls Expansion Project, which involved reconstructing portions of the Shoshone Falls Dam to reduce its aesthetic impact on the area, and to direct low water releases to the most scenic part of the falls, the "Bridal Veil Falls" on the north bank of the river.

See also

Thousand Springs State Park
List of waterfalls in Idaho
List of rivers of Idaho
List of lakes of Idaho

References

External links

Current water flow over Shoshone Falls – City of Twin Falls
Shoshone Falls Scenic Attraction
Visit Southern Idaho - Waterfalls

Videos

Waterfalls of Idaho
Block waterfalls
Snake River
Landforms of Jerome County, Idaho
Landforms of Twin Falls County, Idaho
Twin Falls, Idaho
Parks in Idaho
Protected areas of Twin Falls County, Idaho
Pleistocene United States
Quaternary Idaho